Erbessa augusta is a moth of the family Notodontidae first described by William Warren in 1909. It is found in Brazil and French Guiana.

References

Moths described in 1909
Notodontidae of South America